Henry Hutsby (1886–1971) was an English footballer who played for Stoke.

Career
Hutsby was born in Stafford and joined Stoke in 1908 from local side Stafford Wednesday. He played 32 matches for Stoke in 1908–09 and four times in 1909–10. He left in 1910 for Wrexham and then spent time at his hometown club, Stafford Rangers.

Career statistics

References

English footballers
Stoke City F.C. players
Wrexham A.F.C. players
1886 births
1971 deaths
Stafford Rangers F.C. players
Sportspeople from Stafford
Association football defenders